The nucleus proprius is a layer of the spinal cord adjacent to the substantia gelatinosa. The nucleus proprius can be found in the gray matter in all levels of the spinal cord. It constitutes the first synapse of the spinothalamic tract carrying pain and temperature sensations from peripheral nerves. Cells in this nucleus project to deeper laminae of the spinal cord, to the posterior column nuclei, and to other supraspinal relay centers including the midbrain, thalamus, and hypothalamus. Rexed laminae III and IV make up the nucleus proprius.

The nucleus proprius (NP), along with the substantia gelatinosa of Rolando are involved in sensing pain and temperature.

See also
 Rexed laminae

References

External links

 Diagram at pixelatedbrain.com
 

Spinal cord